Toconao is a village  south of San Pedro de Atacama in the San Pedro de Atacama province of Chile's northern Antofagasta Region.

The most notable building in Toconao is its church. The bell tower is separated from the main church structure and dates from 1750.

Climate

References

 Sernatur - Toconao

Oases of Chile
Landforms of Antofagasta Region
Populated places in El Loa Province